Anthony Barber (1920–2005) was a British politician.

Anthony Barber may also refer to:
 Anthony Barber (basketball) (born 1994), American professional basketball player
 Anthony Barber (boxer) (1939–2004), Australian boxer